is a passenger railway station in located in the city of Higashiōsaka, Osaka Prefecture, Japan, operated by West Japan Railway Company (JR West). It is also the location of a freight depot of the Japan Freight Railway Company (JR Freight).

Lines
Tokuan Station is served by the Katamachi Line (Gakkentoshi Line), and is located 39.8 km from the starting point of the line at Kizu Station.

Station layout
The station has one ground-level side platform and one ground-level island platform, each capable of accommodating eight-car trains, with an elevated station building.

Platforms

Adjacent stations

History
The station was opened on 22 August 1895. 

Station numbering was introduced in March 2018 with Tokuan being assigned station number JR-H38.

Passenger statistics
In fiscal 2019, the station was used by an average of 10,679 passengers daily (boarding passengers only).

Surrounding area
Tokuan Shopping Arcade
Inada Shopping Arcade (Inada Plus Road)
The Kinki Sharyo Co., Ltd.

References

External links

Official home page 

Railway stations in Japan opened in 1895
Railway stations in Osaka Prefecture
Higashiōsaka